Morning Songs by Jim Stärk was an EP which went to no.1 in the Norwegian music charts in 2004. It was the biggest-selling EP in Norwegian chart history.

Track listing
"Morning Song" 2:59	
"Don't You Have a Friend" 4:50	
"Endless Summer" 2:29		
"Like a Summer" 3:42 (written by Townes Van Zandt and Einar Stokkes Fadnes)	
Heart of Coal 4:07

References

External links
Lyrics for 'Morning Song'
Tromsoby review of the EP
Musiq review of the EP

EPs by Norwegian artists
2004 EPs